Institute of Management and Development (IMD) is a business school in New Delhi, India. It is established under the aegis of Ch.Ram Richpal Education and Research Foundation (India). The college has an A+ ranking according to the Business India, BSchool Survey, 2010.

History
The institute commenced with its first batch of students in August 2005.

In 2009, IMD was one of the establishments which faced technical problems with the Common Admission Test (CAT), with 13 students affected.

In 2011, IMD boycotted the CAT.

References

External links
 Official website

Universities and colleges in Delhi
Business schools in Delhi